Elena (Anna) Skordelli (born c. 10 September 1968) is a Cypriot television presenter. In 2009 she was dismissed from her job at Sigma TV. She then worked for CNC Plus TV.

Murder trial
In June 2010, Skortelli along with her brother Tasos Krasopoulis and Andrea Gregoriou, was put on trial for allegedly conspiring to murder Andis Hadjicostis. Hajicostis, who was shot and killed in January 2010, was chief executive of the Dias media group, owner of Skorelli's former employer Sigma TV.

On 13 June 2013, Skordelli, her brother Tasos Krasopoulis, Andreas Gregoriou and Grigoris Xenofontos were found guilty of killing Sigma boss Andis Hadjicostis by the Nicosia Criminal Court and sentenced to life imprisonment.

References

1960s births
Living people
Cypriot women television presenters